Debbie Brown (born 1962) is a multi-racquets coach in Dublin, Ireland. She is a former American college tennis and US National champion squash player. She currently coaches tennis, padel, and pickleball. She has submitted application for Irish citizenship.

Personal life 
She married her partner Orla O'Doherty, a former Irish national squash champion on 18 April 2015.
Brown is currently divorced as of 2022.

Career 
She started her career as a tennis player and played for California State University, Long Beach. Brown later pursued her career in the sport of squash at the age of 33. She became a three time national champion in masters category. She has also featured in masters events in Portland, Oregon, (silver medalist) and in England and Australia. In 2003, she was also a recipient of Silver Anniversary Awards.

Brown competed at the 2012 World Squash Masters along with her partner Orla representing their nations US and Ireland respectively. She is also a programme director of Santa Barbara Squash Academy which is also headed by her partner Orla O'Doherty. She too served as an assistant coach at the Santa Barbara Athletic Club for more than two decades, while serving as Executive Director for the nonprofit afterschool program, Santa Barbara School of Squash.

References 

Living people
American female tennis players
American female squash players
Irish female squash players
LGBT squash players
American LGBT sportspeople
University of Southern California alumni
People from South Pasadena, California
Sportspeople from California
1963 births
USC Trojans women's tennis players
21st-century American LGBT people
Tennis people from California